Hegarty's Cheese is an Irish cheese manufacturer making three different cows milk cheese in Whitechurch, County Cork. Hegarty's cheese first started in 2001 by brothers Dan and John Hegarty on the family farm and were joined in 2016 by Jean-Baptiste Enjelvin, a cheesemaker from France.

Products
 Hegarty's Cheddar - was the first cheese made on the farm and is made from pasteurized milk using traditional methods.
 Templegall - is a Swiss-style raw milk cheese in the style of Comté cheese and has won numerous awards
 Hegarty's Smoked Cheddar - is the same cheese as Hegarty's Cheddar but is naturally smoked with beechwood providing a strong flavour

Awards
In 2019, Templegall won the gold medal in the Raw Milk category at the Irish Cheese Awards
In 2021, Templegall won the Supreme Champion award at the Irish Cheese Awards as well as gold medals in the "Mature Hard Cheese" and "Raw Milk Cheese" categories

References

Dairy products companies of Ireland
Cheesemakers